Italy has participated in all editions of the World Athletics Championships, held since the first edition of 1983 World Athletics Championships, winning 47 podiums, including 12 world titles, 15 silver medals and 19 bronze medals.

Medal count

Medals awarded years later after doping cases

Medalists

By athletes

By events

Placing table 

In the IAAF placing table the score is obtained by assigning eight points in the first place and so on to the eight finalists.

Doping disqualifications

See also
Athletics in Italy
Italy national athletics team
Italy at the European Athletics Championships
Italy at the World Indoor Championships in Athletics

References

External links
 Italy at the World Championships (from page 48) at Daeugu 2011 Media Guide by FIDAL

 
Nations at the World Athletics Championships
Athletics in Italy